David Melech Yisrael (literally, "David is the King of Israel") is a Jewish song about David, an important king of ancient Israel.  Its lyrics are simple and consist of only five words which are repeated many times. These lyrics can be translated into English as saying "David, king of Israel, lives and endures.", transliterated to: David Melekh Yisra'el; Ḥai, Ḥai, Ve'qayam. 

The text comes from the Talmud, where Rabbi Judah the Prince instructs Reb Chiyah to use the phrase as a watchword indicating that the new moon has appeared. The Talmudic Rabbis often used the image of the waxing and waning moon as a metaphor for the power of the Davidic line, which would renew itself with the coming of the Messiah.

Lyrics

English

Hebrew transliteration

Hebrew

References

External links
 David Melech Yisrael; country version
 David Melech Yisrael; karaoke version

Hebrew-language songs
Jewish theology